Twyla Tharp (born July 1, 1941) is an American dancer, choreographer, and author who lives and works in New York City. In 1966 she formed the company Twyla Tharp Dance. Her work often uses classical music, jazz, and contemporary pop music.

From 1971 to 1988, Twyla Tharp Dance toured extensively around the world, performing original works. In 1973 Tharp choreographed Deuce Coupe to the music of The Beach Boys for the Joffrey Ballet. Deuce Coupe is considered the first "crossover ballet", a mix of ballet and modern dance. Later she choreographed Push Comes to Shove (1976), which featured Mikhail Baryshnikov and is now thought to be the best example of crossover ballet.

In 1988, Twyla Tharp Dance merged with American Ballet Theatre, since which time ABT has premiered 16 of Tharp's works.

On May 24, 2018, Tharp was awarded an honorary Doctor of Arts degree by Harvard University.

Early life and education
Tharp was born in 1941 on a farm in Portland, Indiana, the daughter of Lecile Tharp, née Confer, and William Tharp. She was named for Twila Thornburg, the "Pig Princess" of the 89th Annual Muncie Fair.

As a child, Tharp spent a few months each year living with her Quaker grandparents on their farm in Indiana. She would attend Quaker services three times a week.

Tharp's mother insisted she take lessons in dance, various musical instruments, shorthand, German and French. In 1950, Tharp's family—younger sister Twanette, twin brothers Stanley and Stanford, and her parents—moved to Rialto, California. William and Lecile operated Tharp Motors and Tharp Autos in Rialto. They opened a drive-in movie theater, where Tharp worked. The drive-in was on the corner of Acacia and Foothill, Rialto's major east–west artery and the path of Route 66. She attended Pacific High School in San Bernardino, studied at the Vera Lynn School of Dance, and studied ballet with Beatrice Collenette. A "devoted bookworm", Tharp has said her schedule left little time for a social life. She attended Pomona College but transferred to Barnard College, where she graduated with a degree in art history in 1963. In New York City, she studied with Richard Thomas, Martha Graham and Merce Cunningham. In 1963, Tharp joined the Paul Taylor Dance Company.

Career

Dances and ballets
In 1965, Tharp choreographed her first dance, Tank Dive, and formed her own company, Twyla Tharp Dance. Her work often utilizes classical music, jazz, and contemporary pop music. From 1971 to 1988, Twyla Tharp Dance toured extensively around the world, performing original works.

In 1973, Tharp choreographed Deuce Coupe to the music of The Beach Boys for the Joffrey Ballet. Deuce Coupe is considered the first crossover ballet. Later she choreographed Push Comes to Shove (1976), which featured Mikhail Baryshnikov and is now thought to be the best example of crossover ballet.

In 1988, Twyla Tharp Dance merged with American Ballet Theatre, since which time ABT has premiered 16 of Tharp's works. In 2010 it had 20 of her works in its repertory. Tharp has since choreographed dances for Paris Opera Ballet, The Royal Ballet, New York City Ballet, Boston Ballet, Joffrey Ballet, Pacific Northwest Ballet, Miami City Ballet, American Ballet Theatre, Hubbard Street Dance and Martha Graham Dance Company. She also created the dance roadshow Cutting Up (1992) with Baryshnikov, which went on to tour and appeared in 28 cities over two months.

In 2000, Twyla Tharp Dance regrouped with entirely new dancers. This company also performed around the world, and with it Tharp developed the material that became Movin' Out, an award-winning Broadway musical featuring the songs of Billy Joel and starring many of the dancers in the company.

In 2012, Tharp created the full-length ballet The Princess and the Goblin, based on George MacDonald's story The Princess and the Goblin. It is her first ballet to include children, and was co-commissioned by Atlanta Ballet and Royal Winnipeg Ballet and performed by both companies.

Tharp was the first Artist in Residency (A.I.R.) at Pacific Northwest Ballet in Seattle. During this time she created and premiered Waiting At The Station, a work with music by R&B artist Allen Toussaint and sets and costumes by longtime collaborator Santo Loquasto.

A number of prominent fashion designers have designed costumes for Tharp, including Oscar de la Renta, Calvin Klein, and Norma Kamali.

Broadway

In 1980, Tharp's work first appeared on Broadway with Twyla Tharp Dance performing When We Were Very Young, followed in 1981 by The Catherine Wheel, her collaboration with David Byrne at the Winter Garden. Wheel was broadcast on PBS and its soundtrack released on LP. Her dance piece Fait Accompli was set to music by David Van Tieghem as released on the These Things Happen LP (1984).

In 1985, her staging of Singin' in the Rain played at the Gershwin for 367 performances.

Tharp premiered her dance musical Movin' Out, set to the music and lyrics of Billy Joel, in Chicago in 2001. The show opened on Broadway in 2002. Movin' Out ran for 1,331 performances on Broadway. A national tour opened in January 2004. It received 10 Tony nominations and Tharp won Best Choreographer.

Tharp opened a new show, The Times They Are a-Changin', to the music of Bob Dylan in 2005 at The Old Globe Theatre in San Diego. The Times They are A-Changin''' set the records for the highest-grossing show and highest ticket sales as of the date of closing (March 2006). It was also the first show to receive a second extension before the first preview. After its run in California, the New York show ran for 35 previews and 28 performances.

In 2009, Tharp worked with the songs of Frank Sinatra to mount Come Fly with Me, which ran at the Alliance Theater in Atlanta and was the best-selling four-week run as of the date of closing in 2009. Renamed Come Fly Away, the show opened on Broadway in 2010 at the Marquis Theatre and ran for 26 previews and 188 performances. Come Fly Away, was retooled and opened under the title Sinatra: Dance with Me at The Wynn Las Vegas in 2011. Come Fly Away National Tour opened in Atlanta in August 2011.

Film and television
Tharp collaborated with film directors Miloš Forman on Hair (1978), Ragtime (1980) and Amadeus (1983); Taylor Hackford on White Nights (1985); and James Brooks on I'll Do Anything (1994).

Television credits include choreographing Sue's Leg (1976) for the inaugural episode of the PBS program Dance in America; co-producing and directing Making Television Dance (1977), which won the Chicago International Film Festival Award; and directing The Catherine Wheel (1983) for BBC Television. Tharp co-directed the award-winning television special "Baryshnikov by Tharp" in 1984.

Author
Tharp has written three books: an early autobiography, Push Comes to Shove (1992; Bantam Books); The Creative Habit: Learn It and Use It for Life (2003, Simon & Schuster), translated into Spanish, Chinese, Russian, Korean, Thai and Japanese; and The Collaborative Habit (2009, Simon & Schuster), also translated into Thai, Chinese and Korean. Tharp indicated that The Creative Habit is about cybernetics, especially in the several Greek-themed creative exercises, such as the Coin Drop; the Coin Drop, as an exercise in extracting ordered meaning from chaos, is derived from the astrological muse Urania, in that random coins falling onto a flat surface can be used to develop pattern analysis skills. The astrological theme is an etymological underpinning of cybernetics' tradition of "guiding a boat" by sighting stellar references according to ancient Greek navigation.

Works chronology
Dances/ballets/theatre

Tank Dive	4/29/65
Stage Show	7/7/65
Stride	8/9/65
Cede Blue Lake	12/1/65
Unprocessed	12/1/65
Re-Moves	10/18/66
Twelve Foot Change	10/18/66
One, Two, Three	2/2/67
Jam	   2/4/67
Disperse	   4/27/67
Yancey Dance 7/1/67
Three Page Sonata	7/6/67
Forevermore	2/9/68
Generation	2/9/68
One Way	   2/9/68
Excess, Idle, Surplus	4/25/68
Group Activities	1/13/69
After Suite	2/2/69
Medley	7/19/69
Dancing In The Streets	11/11/69
Sowing Of Seeds 6/7/70
The Willie Smith Series	7/10/70
Rose's Cross Country	8/1/70
Fugue, The	8/1/70
The One Hundreds	8/1/70
11-Minute Abstract, Repertory 1965-70 11/16/70
The History of Up and Down, I and II	1/22/71
Sunrise, Noon, Sundown 5/28/71
Mozart Sonata K.545	8/1/71
Eight Jelly Rolls	9/16/71
Torelli	11/2/71
Piano Rolls 11/7/71
The Bix Pieces	    4/14/71
The Raggedy Dances	10/26/72Deuce Coupe (ballet)    2/8/73
As Time Goes By	10/10/73
In the Beginnings	1/26/74
All About Eggs	2/1/74
The Fugue on London Weekend Television 4/22/74
Twyla Tharp and Eight Jelly Rolls	5/12/74
Bach Duet	9/5/74
Deuce Coupe II	2/1/75
Sue's Leg 2/21/75
The Double Cross	2/21/75
Ocean's Motion	6/22/75
Rags Suite Duet	9/10/75
Push Comes To Shove	1/9/76
Sue's Leg, Remembering the Thirties	3/24/76
Give and Take	   3/25/76
Once More Frank	7/12/76
Country Dances	9/4/76
Happily Ever After	11/3/76
After All	11/15/76
Cacklin' Hen	2/14/77
Fifty Ways To Leave Your Lover 5/12/77
Mud	5/12/77
Simon Medley	5/12/77
The Hodge Podge 5/12/77
1903	2/2/79
Chapters and Verses	2/2/79
Baker's Dozen	    2/15/79
Three Dances From The Film "Hair"    2/15/79
Three Fanfares	3/14/79
Brahms Paganini	2/8/80
Deuce Coupe III 2/8/80
Assorted Quartets	7/29/80
Third Suite	8/26/80
Short Stories	8/27/80
Uncle Edgar Dyed His Hair Red	2/28/81The Catherine Wheel 9/22/81 (music by David Byrne)
Nine Sinatra Songs	10/15/82
Bad Smells	10/15/82
The Little Ballet	4/1/84
Telemann	11/4/83
Fait Accompli	11/8/83 (music by David Van Tieghem)
"The Golden Section"	11/8/83 (music by David Byrne) (also filmed for PBS)
Sinatra Suite	12/6/83
Bach Partita	12/9/83Brahms/Handel (ballet), choreography by Tharp and Jerome Robbins 6/7/84
Sorrow Floats	 7/5/84
Singin' in the Rain - Broadway	    7/2/85In The Upper Room    8/28/86 (music by Philip Glass)
Ballare	8/30/86
The Catherine Wheel III 2/2/87
Quartet	2/4/89
Bum's Rush	2/8/89
Rules of the Game	 2/17/89
Everlast	 2/21/89
Brief Fling	2/28/90
Grand Pas: Rhythm of the Saints	10/1/91 (music by Paul Simon)
Men's Piece	10/4/91
Octet	10/4/91
Sextet	1/30/92
Cutting Up: A Dance Roadshow	11/27/93
Bare Bones 11/27/93
Pergolesi	    6/4/93
Demeter & Persephone	10/5/93
Waterbaby Bagatelles	 4/30/94
"New Works" Twyla Tharp in Washington: Red, White & Blues"	9/13/94
How Near Heaven	3/3/95
Americans We	   5/1/95
Jump Start	5/1/95
I Remember Clifford	8/9/95
Mr. Worldly Wise	12/9/95
The Elements	5/3/96
Sweet Fields	9/20/96
"66"	9/20/96
Heroes	9/20/96
Roy's Joys	8/18/97
Story Teller, The	10/29/97
Noir 1/30/98
Yemaya	3/13/98
Known By Heart Duet	8/6/98
Diabelli	10/22/98
Known By Heart	11/3/98
The Junk Duet 11/3/98
Grosse Sonate	   7/1/98
Beethoven Seventh	1/22/00
The Brahms/Haydn Variations aka: Variations on a Theme by Haydn	3/21/00
Mozart Clarinet Quintet K. 581	7/6/00
Surfer At The River Styx	7/6/00
Westerly Round	6/23/01Movin' Out - Chicago	6/25/02Movin' Out - New York	    10/24/02
Even The King	   1/11/03Movin' Out - US Tour	1/27/04The Times They Are A-Changin' - California	2/9/06
Catherine Wheel Suite	5/11/06The Times They Are A-Changin' - New York 10/26/06
NIGHTSPOT	3/28/08
Rabbit and Rogue	6/3/08 (music by Danny Elfman)
Opus 111	9/25/08
Afternoon Ball 9/25/08
Come Fly With Me	9/23/09Come Fly Away	3/25/10
Sinatra: Dance With Me -	12/11/10
Armenia 4/23/11Come Fly Away Tour 8/3/11
Scarlatti 10/13/11
The Princess and The Goblin - Atlanta 2/10/12
The Princess and the Goblin - Winnipeg 10/17/12
Treefrog in Stonehenge 07/26/13
Waiting at the Station 09/27/13
Come Fly Away (Ballet)    09/28/13
 Beethoven Opus 130 2016

Collaborative work
 Brahms/Handel with Jerome Robbins 6/7/84

FilmographyHair	3/12/78Ragtime 	1980Amadeus 	9/19/84White Nights 12/6/85I'll Do Anything	1994

VideoScrapbook Tape  10/25/82The Catherine Wheel	3/1/83Baryshnikov by Tharp / Push Comes to Shove	10/5/84Twyla Tharp: Oppositions    4/24/96

Television
The Bix Pieces (series of productions)	1973Making Television Dance	10/4/77Dance Is A Man's Sport Too 1980Confessions of a Cornermaker 	10/13/81Catherine Wheel, PBS 3/1/83
"The Golden Section" from Dance in America: Miami City Ballet 10/28/11

Books
 Tharp, Twyla (December 1992), Push Comes to Shove, Bantam Books, 
 Tharp, Twyla (September 29, 2003), The Creative Habit: Learn It and Use It for Life, Simon & Schuster, 
 Tharp, Twyla (November 24, 2009), The Collaborative Habit: Learn It and Use It for Life, Simon & Schuster, 
 Tharp, Twyla (October 29, 2019), Keep It Moving: Lessons for the Rest of Your Life, Simon & Schuster, 

Honors and awards

Tharp has received two Emmy Awards, 19 honorary doctorates, the Vietnam Veterans of America President's Award, the 2004 National Medal of the Arts, and numerous grants, including a MacArthur Fellowship. She is a member of the American Academy of Arts and Sciences, the American Philosophical Society, and an Honorary Member of the American Academy of Arts and Letters.

At the 1982 Barnard College commencement ceremonies, Tharp's alma mater awarded her its highest honor, the Barnard Medal of Distinction.

She received the Tony Award for Best Choreography and the Drama Desk Award for Outstanding Choreography for Movin' Out. She received a Drama Desk nomination for Outstanding Choreography for Singin' in the Rain.

Tharp was named a Kennedy Center Honoree for 2008. She was inducted into the Academy of Achievement in 1993.

From 2013 to 2014, the Smithsonian National Portrait Gallery featured Tharp in the critically acclaimed "Dancing the Dream" exhibition as a pioneer of American modern dance.

On May 24, 2018, she was awarded the Doctor of Arts degree by Harvard University.

Awards by year

1965
Walter Gutman

1969
George Irwin
The Lepercq Foundation

1970
Foundation for the Contemporary Performing Arts, 1970
Guggenheim Foundation Fellowship, John S. Guggenheim Memorial Foundation
The Emma A. Sheafer Trust, 1970–1981, 1985

1971
John Simon Guggenheim Memorial Foundation, 1971, 1974
National Endowment for the Arts Choreographers Fellowship, 1971, 1973
New York State Council on the Arts Annual Support, 1971–1986

1972
Brandeis University, Creative Arts Citation

1973
National Endowment for the Arts Annual Support, 1973–1986

1974
Creative Artists Public Service Program
Edward John Nobel Foundation
New York Public Library Dance Collection
The Place Trust, London
The Andrew W. Mellon Foundation, 1974–1978, 1982, 1983, 1986

1975
Eight Jelly Rolls, 1st in Festival in Video and Modern Dance Video Certificate of Honor
Making Television Dance, Modern Dance Video Certificate of Merit

1976
Mademoiselle Magazine, Mademoiselle Magazine Award
Exxon Corporation, 1976, 1980, 1982–1984, 1986

1977
The Green Fund, 1977, 1980, 1981
National Endowment for the Arts Challenge Grant, 1977, 1985
The Shubert Foundation, 1977, 1978, 1980–1986

1978
Dance Film Association, 7th Annual Dance Video and Film Festival
Honorary Degree, California Institute of the Arts
Silver Satellite Award for Making Television Dance, American Women in Radio & Television
The Ford Foundation, 1978, 1980
The Ford Motor Company, 1978–1985
The Surdna Foundation, 1978, 1980, 1985

1979
Soho Arts Second Annual Awards, The SoHo Weekly News
Honorary Degree, Bucknell University
The Scherman Foundation, 1979, 1980, 1982–1985
United Artists
The David Merrick Arts Foundation
Mobil Foundation, Inc., 1979, 1981–1986

1980
Honorary Degree, Bates College
Dance Educators of America Award for Making Television Dance
Screening and Red Ribbon Award for Making Television Dance
The Booth Ferris Foundation
Chase Manhattan Bank, 1980–1982
Con Ed, 1980–1985
Morgan Guarantee Trust, 1980–1981, 1983–1984, 1986
The Jerome Robbins Foundation, 1980, 1983

1981
Film Library Association American Film Festival
Honorary Degree, Bard College
Honorary Degree, Brown University
Dance Magazine Award, Dance Magazine
Dance Film Award for Making Television Dance, Chicago International Film Festival
Indiana Arts Award, Indiana Arts Commission
Citibank, 1981–1986
Doll Foundation, 1981–1986
Weil Foundation
Norman and Rosita Winston Foundation
Rockefeller Foundation

1982
Medal of Distinction, Barnard College
Chemical Bank, 1982–1986
National Corporate Fund for Dance, 1982–1985
Robert Sterling Clark Foundation
Ida and William Rosenthal Foundation, 1982, 1986
New York Telephone, 1982–1985

1983
Spirit of Achievement Award, Albert Einstein College of Medicine
Honorary Degree, Williams College
Indiana Arts Award, Indiana Arts Commission
The Thorne Foundation
Lila Wallace-Reader's Digest Fund, 1983–1984, 1986
C.L. Glazer Trust
The Klingenstein Fund
Warner Communications

1984
Mayor's Award of Honor for Arts and Culture, Edward I. Koch, New York City
Dance Masters of America 1984 Choreographer's Award
Arthur Andersen and Company, 1984–1986
Japan-U.S. Friendship Commission
Booth Ferris Foundation
Brooklyn Union and Gas
Merrill Lynch, 1984, 1986
New York Times Company Foundation, 1984–1986

1985
Emmy Awards for Baryshnikov by Tharp choreography and co-direction, Academy of Television Arts and Sciences
Directors Guild of America Award for Outstanding Directorial Achievement for Baryshnikov by Tharp
Indiana Arts Award, Indiana Arts Commission
APA Trucking
The Charles Engelhard Foundation
Corporate Property Investors
Hausman Belding Foundation
Gerald D. Hines Interests
GFI/Knoll International
NBC, 1985–1986
Samuel I. Newhouse Foundation, 1985, 1986
Zayre Corporation

1986
University Medal of Excellence, Columbia University
Bankers Trust
Cadillac Fairview
MCA
Manufacturers Hanover Trust Company
Ridgewood Energy Corporation

1987
Honorary Degree, Indiana University
Honorary Degree, Pomona College

1988
Honorary Degree, Hamilton College
Honorary Degree, Skidmore College

1989
Honorary Degree, Marymount Manhattan College
Lions of the Performing Arts Award, New York Public Library

1990
Samuel M. Scripps Award, American Dance Festival

1991
Laurence Olivier Award for In the Upper Room, Laurence Olivier Foundation
Wexner Foundation Award, The Ohio State University Wexner Center for the Arts

1992
MacArthur Fellowship, John D. and Catherine T. MacArthur Foundation
Ruth Page Visiting Arts, Harvard University, 1992–1993

1993
Golden Plate Award, American Academy of Achievement
Woman of Achievement, Barnard College
Inducted, American Academy of Arts and Sciences

1996
Arts Award, Dickinson College
Honorary Degree, Ball State University
Distinguished Artist Award, International Society For The Performing Arts

1997
American Honorary Member, American Academy of Arts and Letters

1998
Trust for Mutual Understanding

1999
MOCA Award to Distinguished Women In The Arts, Museum Of Contemporary Art

2000
The Doris Duke Awards for New Work

2001
Women's Project & Productions Exceptional Achievement Award

2002
New York Awards Lifetime Achievement

2003
Drama Desk Award Outstanding Choreography: Movin' OutTony Award Best Choreography: Movin' OutDrama League Outstanding Achievement Award for Musical Theatre
TDF/Astaire Award Best Choreographer: Movin' OutIndiana Living Legend, Indiana Historical Society
Glamour Woman of the Year Award
Outstanding Contribution to the Arts Award North Carolina School of the Arts
Honorary Doctorate, North Carolina School of the Arts

2004
National Medal of Arts
Vietnam Veterans of America President's Award for Excellence in the Arts
Independent Reviewers of New England Award Best Choreography: Movin' Out. Broadway in Boston
Goddard Space Flight Center's Center Director's Colloquium Citation for Enlightening, Creative and Thought-Provoking Presentation

2005
Best Choreography: Movin' Out. Touring Broadway Awards
Jane Addams Medal for Distinguished Service presented by Rockford College

2006
Princess Grace Award – Outstanding Artistry
Critics Circle Dance Award Outstanding Choreography: Movin' Out. London

2007
Honorary Degree, Duke University, Durham, North Carolina
Honorary Degree, Princeton University, Princeton, NJ
Touring Broadway Award: Best Choreography for a touring show for Movin' Out2008
The Jerome Robbins Prize
The Kennedy Center Honors
Woman of the Year Award, presented by Nevada State Ballet

2009U.S. News & World Report: listed on "America's Best Leaders"
Leadership at Harvard University's Kennedy School of Government

2010
The IAL Diamond Award for Achievement in the Arts, presented by Columbia University's The Varsity Show
The Drama Desk Award for Outstanding Choreographer: Come Fly AwayLifetime Achievement Award, presented by The American Academy of Hospitality Sciences
Suzi Bass Award for Best Choreography:  "Come Fly With Me"
Rolex Dance Award

2011
The Vasterling Award, Presented by Nashville Ballet
Honorary Degree, The Juilliard School, New York, NY
TITAS Award for Contributions to the Arts
Woman of Achievement Award, Meredith College
Spotlight Award, Presented by Hubbard Street Dance Chicago

2013
Lifetime Achievement Award, presented by Tribeca Film Festival

2014
62nd Capezio Dance Award
Honorary Degree, University of Southern California, Los Angeles, CA

Personal life
Until 1972 Tharp was married to painter Robert Huot, by whom she has a son, Jesse Huot, who acts as her business manager. She also has a grandson.

See also
 List of dancers

 Citations 

 General and cited sources 
 Siegel, Marcia B. Howling Near Heaven''. New York: St. Martin's Press, 2006.

External links
 
 
 
 Archival footage of Twyla Tharp's Nine Sinatra Songs in 1993 at Jacob's Pillow
 Twyla Tharp performing The One Hundreds in 2001 at Jacob's Pillow
 Alvin Ailey performing a ballet by Twyla Tharp
 Twyla Tharp Biography and Interview on American Academy of Achievement
 American Masters (S35 Ep3) Twyla Moves

1941 births
Living people
American women choreographers
American choreographers
Barnard College alumni
Drama Desk Award winners
Primetime Emmy Award winners
Kennedy Center honorees
MacArthur Fellows
Modern dancers
People from Portland, Indiana
Tony Award winners
United States National Medal of Arts recipients
Choreographers of American Ballet Theatre
People from Rialto, California
20th-century American women writers
Pomona College alumni
Dancers from Indiana
Writers from Indiana
21st-century American women writers
Prix Benois de la Danse winners